Namjung station is a railway station in Namjung-rodongjagu, Unhŭng county, Ryanggang province, North Korea, on the Paektusan Ch'ŏngnyŏn Line of the Korean State Railway.

The station, along with the rest of the Paegam–Pongdu-ri section, was opened by the Chosen Government Railway on 1 September 1935.

On 9 October 2006 an underground nuclear test was conducted at P'unggye-ri in Kilju County, causing the closure of the line for 3–4 months.

References

Railway stations in North Korea